Paradiscoglossus is an extinct genus of prehistoric amphibian. It is known from fossils from the United States (Wyoming), Romania, and Spain.

See also

 Prehistoric amphibian
 List of prehistoric amphibians

References

Prehistoric frogs
Cretaceous amphibians of Europe
Cretaceous amphibians of North America